Nelson Alberto Martínez Sevilla (born October 25, 1991) is an Ecuadorian football midfielder.

A product of the LDU Quito's youth system, he began making senior club appearances for Liga in 2010. In his professional debut against Independiente del Valle, he ran into defender Armando Wila, fracturing his cheekbone. The injury required Martínez to undergo surgery. In June 2011, he was loaned to Aucas.

Honors
LDU Quito
Serie A: 2010

References

External links
Martínez's FEF player card 

1991 births
Living people
Footballers from Quito
Association football midfielders
Ecuadorian footballers
L.D.U. Quito footballers
S.D. Aucas footballers